Bukit Merah Single Member Constituency was a constituency in Singapore. It existed from 1959 to 1997, when it was merged with Leng Kee division of the Tanjong Pagar GRC.

Member of Parliament

Elections

Elections in 1950s

Elections in 1960s

Elections in 1970s

Elections in 1980s

Elections in 1990s

References

Singaporean electoral divisions
Bukit Merah